The Mock Turtles are an English indie rock band, formed in Middleton, Greater Manchester, in 1985, who enjoyed some success in the early 1990s. Their most famous song "Can You Dig It?", which was released in the UK in 1991, charted at number 18. When the song was re-released in slightly remixed form in 2003, it again reached the Top 20 of the UK Singles Chart.

Career

Led by former Judge Happiness singer Martin Coogan, elder brother of actor/comedian Steve Coogan, the band began to pick up attention around 1990, with debut album Turtle Soup and tracks such as "Lay Me Down" and "And Then She Smiles" on the Imaginary label. It was "Can You Dig It?", however, which gained them wider attention. Originally a b-side to "Lay Me Down", the band's new record label, Siren, re-issued it with additional guitar work, and "Can You Dig It?" breached the Top 20 in the UK Singles Chart.
Their follow up single "And Then She Smiles" failed to replicate the success of the previous single, only reaching no. 44 in the chart.

In March 1991, the British music magazine NME reported that the band were appearing at the 'Great Indie Festival – A Midsummer's Day Dream' at Milton Keynes Bowl in June that year.  Also on the bill were 808 State, Gary Clail, Shades of Rhythm, The Shamen, Paris Angels plus Flowered Up.

The Mock Turtles, however, were unable to follow up the early success and were dropped by their label, three members briefly joining up as Ugli in the mid-1990s, remaining in limbo until Vodafone used "Can You Dig It?" for an advertising campaign in late 2002 and more famously in 2003. This saw the band make a comeback with Norman Cook doing a remix of the song, taking the track to No. 19 in the United Kingdom. Eight new tracks were included on a new Greatest Hits album, together with older songs from their early 1990s peak. Most recently, the track "And Then She Smiles" has been used as the theme song for the television programme Stella on Sky1.

Turtle Soup was reissued in 2017 with additional non-album singles and B-sides and covers.

Current Members
Martin Coogan - vocals, guitar, percussion (1985–present)
Martin Glyn Murray - guitar (1985–present)
Andrew Stewardson - bass, viola, guitar (1989–present)
Joanne Gent - keyboards, cello, guitar (1989–present)
Steve Barnard - drums (1993–present)

Former Members
Steve Cowen - drums (1985–93)
Steve Green - bass (1985–89)
Krzysztof Korab - keyboards (1985–89)

Discography

Albums
Turtle Soup (LP/CD) – Imaginary Records 1990
87–90 (LP/CD) – Imaginary Records 1991
Two Sides (LP/CD) – Siren Records 1991
Can You Dig It – The Best of the Mock Turtles – Virgin Records 2003

Singles
"Pomona" (12") Imaginary Records 1987
"Wicker Man" (12") Imaginary Records 1989
"And Then She Smiles" (12") Imaginary Records 1989
"Lay Me Down" (12"/CDS) Imaginary Records 1990
"Magic Boomerang EP" (7"/12"/CDS) Imaginary Records 1990
"Are You Experienced?" (12") Imaginary Records 1990
"Can You Dig It?" (7"/12"/CDS/C-s) Siren Records 1991 UK No. 18
"And Then She Smiles EP" (7"/12"/CDS) Siren Records 1991 UK No. 44
"Strings And Flowers" (7"/12"/CDS/C-s) Siren Records 1991
"Can You Dig It?" (Fatboy Slim remix) (CDS) Virgin Records 2003 UK No. 19

Compilation appearances
Beyond the Wildwood – A Tribute to Syd Barrett – "No Good Trying"  – 1987, Imaginary Records
Fast 'n' Bulbous - A Tribute To Captain Beefheart – "Big Eyed Beans From Venus" 1988 Imaginary Records
Shangri-La – A Tribute to the Kinks – "Shangri-La" / "Big Sky" 1989 Imaginary Records
Time Between – A Tribute to the Byrds – "Time Between" / "Why" 1989 Imaginary Records
Indie Top 20 Volume X – "Lay Me Down"  1990 Beechwood Music
Ouch. Relativity Sampler – "Mary's Garden" 1991 Relativity
Fifteen Minutes: A Tribute to the Velvet Underground – "Pale Blue Eyes" 1994

Compilations that feature "Can You Dig It?" are:
The Best Bands... Ever! Virgin/EMI, 2002
Q: The Album Virgin/EMI/Universal, 2003
I Luv Smash Hits Virgin/EMI, 2003
Now That's What I Call Music! 54 Virgin/EMI, 2003
The X-List Virgin/EMI, 2003
"Smash Hits Chart Summer 2003" Virgin/EMI, 2003
 "EPIC" Sony Music Entertainment UK, 2010
101 Indie Classics EMI TV, 2010

References

Musical groups from Greater Manchester
Music in the Metropolitan Borough of Rochdale
English indie rock groups
People from Middleton, Greater Manchester
Madchester groups
Imaginary Records artists
Virgin Records artists